The south Florida pine flatwoods are a flatwoods forest community found in central and southern Florida. 

These flatwoods have open canopies of slash pine (Pinus elliottii var. densa) above a dense understory of low shrubs and grasses in places where low-intensity fires are frequent. Where fires have been suppressed, slash pine, shrubs, and saw palmetto (Serenoa repens) become more dense.

In addition to saw palmetto, the shrubs Appalachian tea (Ilex glabra), coastal plain staggerbush (Lyonia fruticosa), dwarf live oak (Quercus minima), shiny blueberry (Vaccinium myrsinites), and rosy camphorweed (Pluchea rosea) can be found in the flatwoods. Wiregrass (Aristida beyrichiana) is the dominant grass.

This system is similar to Florida dry prairie, but has taller and denser shrub cover.

References

Plant communities of Florida
Ecoregions of Florida
Flora of Florida